The GR 58, also: Tour du Queyras, is a long-distance walking route of the Grande Randonnée network in France. It forms a 108 km long loop in the Queyras, one of France's regional parks, in the department of the Hautes-Alpes. It passes through Ceillac, Saint-Véran, Abriès, Les Fonds and Brunissard.

References

Hiking trails in France